Lake Dallas is a city in Denton County, Texas, United States. It is located in North Texas, northwest of the city of Dallas, on the shores of Lewisville Lake. The community's name derives from the original name of the lake. It is also one of the 4 communities in the Lake Cities.

Geography

Lake Dallas is located at  (33.128297, –97.027592). The climate in this area is characterized by hot, humid summers and generally mild to cool winters. According to the Köppen Climate Classification system, Lake Dallas has a humid subtropical climate, abbreviated "Cfa" on climate maps.

Demographics

As of the 2020 United States census, there were 7,708 people, 2,950 households, and 2,216 families residing in the city.

Education
The city of Lake Dallas is served by the Lake Dallas Independent School District. Lake Dallas is divided between the zones for Lake Dallas Elementary School and Shady Shores Elementary School. All residents are zoned to Lake Dallas Middle School and Lake Dallas High School.

The library for the area is the Lake Cities Library. The Lake Dallas Independent School District employs 570 people.

Transportation
The North Texas Tollway Authority has completed a bridge in August 2009 linking Lake Dallas and Little Elm, Texas.  The bridge connects Swisher Road in Lake Dallas with Eldorado Parkway in Little Elm.  A bridge previously connected the two cities, but was removed in the 1950s when the United States Army Corps of Engineers expanded Lewisville Lake.

Notable people

 Myra Crownover, former member of the Texas House of Representatives
 Dusty Dvoracek, football player and sports commentator
 Gordon McLendon, radio broadcaster
 Vitamin Smith, football player
 Daryl Williams, football player

References

External links
City of Lake Dallas official website
Lake Dallas Map, hosted by the Portal to Texas History
The Lake Cities Sun, local newspaper

Dallas–Fort Worth metroplex
Cities in Texas
Cities in Denton County, Texas